This article stated the results of the South American Soling Championships from 1971 till 1979. Not all crew names are documented in the major sources: United States Soling Association (USSA) bulletin "Leading Edge" and International Soling Association (ISA) magazine "Soling Sailing".

1971 Final results 
Only the winning helmsman and venue are documented.

1972 Final results 

 1972 Progress

1973 Final results 
Only the winning helmsman and venue are documented.

1974 Final results 
Only ranking and venue but no detailed results are documented.

1975 Final results 

Only ranking of the first five boats no detailed results are documented.

1976 Final results 
Only the winning helmsman and venue are documented.

1977 Final results 

 1977 Progress

1978 Final results 
Only ranking and venue but no detailed results are documented. 

Only ranking and total no detailed results are documented.

1979 Final results 
Only the top three helmsman and venue are documented.

1980 Final results 
Only the top 3  and a major incident are documented.

In race 4 on Friday 21 two boats sunk due to winds over 60 km/h and rough waters. The team of helmsman Dave Perry on STORM KING were saved. One crew member of INDIO of helmsman Juan Carlos Soneyra got entangled in the forstay. In spite of the great efforts of his team he could not be released and drowned. No race was sailed on Saturday 22. The 5th and final race was sailed on Sunday 23.

1981 Final results

1982 Final results

1983 Final results 

 1983 Progress

1984 Final results 
Only the winning helmsman and venue are documented.

1985 Final results 
Only the winning helmsman and venue are documented.

1986 Final results 
Only the winning helmsman and venue are documented.

1987 Final results 
Only ranking of the first five boats, helmsman and venue are documented.

1988 Final results

1989 Final results

1990 Final results 

 1990 Progress

Further results
For further results see:
 Soling South American Championship results (1971–90)

References

Soling South American Championships